Elgy Morales (born on 21 September 1975) is a Costarrican football coach. The details are unknown but he also possibly got naturalized Puertorrican after living and working there for some years.

References

1975 births
Living people
Puerto Rican football managers
Puerto Rico national football team managers